The Finnish national road 55 is the 2nd class main route between the municipality of Mäntsälä and the city of Porvoo in southern Finland. It also passes through the municipality of Askola. Going in the opposite direction, from Mäntsälä to Hanko, the road continues as the 1st class main road 25. Together with the aforementioned road, it forms the Helsinki Metropolitan Circuit and is often referred to as the outer beltway of the Greater Helsinki or also known as the Ring V.

Route 

The road passes through the following localities:
Mäntsälä (Mäntsälä and Sääksjärvi)
Askola (Vahijärvi and Monninkylä)
Porvoo (Kaarenkylä, Tuorila, Saksala and Porvoo)

References

External links

Roads in Finland